Adam James Lingner (born November 2, 1960) is a former American football offensive lineman who played thirteen seasons in the National Football League (NFL) with the Kansas City Chiefs and the Buffalo Bills. Lingner was drafted in 1983 in the 9th round by the Kansas City Chiefs, and was the lowest draft pick to make the squad. He was a member of Buffalo's teams in four consecutive Super Bowl games: Super Bowl XXV, Super Bowl XXVI, Super Bowl XXVII and Super Bowl XXVIII.

Adam Linger is most known for being the long-snapper on the "wide right" field goal by Scott Norwood in Super Bowl XXV.  Lingner is also one of only 22 players to play in all of the Buffalo Bills Super Bowl appearances in the early 1990s.

References

1960 births
Living people
American football offensive linemen
Kansas City Chiefs players
Buffalo Bills players
Illinois Fighting Illini football players